Hum Dekhenge ( - In english We shall see) is a popular Urdu nazm, written by the Pakistani poet Faiz Ahmad Faiz. Originally written as Va Yabqá Vajhu Rabbika (And the countenance of your Lord will outlast all), it was included in the seventh poetry book of Faiz -- Mere Dil Mere Musafir.

Background 
The nazm was composed as a medium of protest against Zia Ul Haq's oppressive regime. It gained a rapid cult-following as a leftist song of resistance and defiance, after a public rendition by Iqbal Bano at Alhamra Arts Council on 13 February 1986, ignoring the ban on Faiz's poetry.

Themes 
Faiz employs the metaphor of traditional Islamic imagery to subvert and challenge Zia's fundamentalist interpretation of them; Qayamat, the Day of Reckoning is transformed into the Day of Revolution, wherein Zia's military government will be ousted by the people and democracy will be re-installed.

In popular culture

Media 
The song was recreated in Coke Studio Season 11 on 22 July 2018, under the aegis of Zohaib Kazi and Ali Hamza. In the movie The Kashmir Files (2022), it was depicted as being sung by students of a left-leaning Indian university to as a song of protest

Protests 
The poem gained importance in protests against Pervez Musharraf in the early 2000s. 

During the Citizenship Amendment Act protests in India, faculty members of IIT Kanpur took issue with Hum Dekhenge being sung by protesting students in the campus, and alleged it to be "anti-Hindu". The IIT instituted a commission to look into the issue. The student media body rejected the charges as being misinformed and communal, which divorced the poem from its societal context.

Notes and references

Notes

References

External links 
 For a translation and more on the IIT protest: 

Poetry by Faiz Ahmad Faiz
Ghazal songs
1985 songs
Pakistani songs
Faiz Ahmad Faiz
Asim Azhar songs